Accessory to War: The Unspoken Alliance Between Astrophysics and the Military is the fifteenth book by American astrophysicist and science communicator Neil deGrasse Tyson which he co-wrote with researcher and writer Avis Lang. It was released on September 11, 2018 by W. W. Norton & Company. The book chronicles war and the use of space as a weapon, including Christopher Columbus use of his knowledge of a lunar eclipse and the use of satellite intelligence by the United States during the Gulf War.

References

Books by Neil deGrasse Tyson
Astronomy books
Cosmology books
2018 non-fiction books
Popular physics books
W. W. Norton & Company books